Karlsen is a Danish-Norwegian patronymic surname meaning "son of Karl" (\k(a)-rl\), an Old German given name. The form Carlsen is cognate. The parallel Swedish forms are Karlsson and Carlsson. People with the surname include:

 Alexandria Karlsen (born 1978), American model, actress and author
 Atle Karlsen (keyboardist) (?-), keyboardist of the Norwegian Rock band DumDum Boys
 Geir Karlsen (born 1948), Norwegian footballer
 Geir Karlsen (born 1965), Norwegian CEO
 Johan Sigurd Karlsen (1894–1967), Norwegian politician
 Kari Karlsen (born 1952), Norwegian high jumper
 Karl Henry Karlsen (1893–1979), Norwegian politician
 Lars Olav Karlsen (born 1976), Norwegian actor
 Morten Karlsen (born 1979), Danish footballer
 Svend Karlsen (born 1967), Norwegian strongman
 Tor Ottar Karlsen (born 1950), Norwegian politician

See also
 Styrmand Karlsen, a 1958 Danish film

References

Danish-language surnames
Norwegian-language surnames
Patronymic surnames
Surnames from given names